Peter Samu (born 17 December 1991) is an Australian professional rugby union player who is currently a loose forward for the  in Super Rugby. He has represented Australia in international rugby.

Early life 

Born in Melbourne, Australia, Samu first made his way in rugby playing for Moorabbin Rugby Club in his juniors before moving interstate to Brisbane and playing a handful of games in the first grade for Sunnybank Rugby. Samu played minimal first grade rugby in Brisbane, due to Wallabies (at the time) Jake Shatz and Liam Gill.

Professional career 
In 2012, Samu moved to Sydney to play for Randwick where he played majority of his rugby in premier division for the Shute Shield. He played a strong season in 2012 and won the most valuable player of the year award for the Shute Shield competition. Samu also had two-year stint in England playing local club rugby for St. Ives from 2010. He later moved to New Zealand in 2014 and began playing for Waimea Old Boys in the Tasman club rugby competition.

Tasman and Crusaders 

Samu played for the  Knights development team in 2015 and was named as their player of the year before being promoted to their senior squad ahead of the 2016 Super Rugby season.   With competition for places tough among a star-studded Crusaders line-up which featured the likes of Kieran Read and Matt Todd, it was perhaps unsurprising that Samu only made 4 substitute appearances during his debut season.   He was retained in the squad for 2017.

Wallabies and Brumbies 
On 29 May 2018, Samu joined the Brumbies for the 2019 Super Rugby season with the possibility of a Wallabies call-up.

Statistics

List of international test tries 
As of 3 July 2022

References

External links 
 Pete Samu at Wallabies
 Pete Samu at ItsRugby.co.uk
 Pete Samu at ESPNscrum

1991 births
Living people
Australia international rugby union players
Australian sportspeople of Samoan descent
Australian rugby union players
ACT Brumbies players
Canberra Vikings players
Crusaders (rugby union) players
Rugby union flankers
Rugby union number eights
Rugby union players from Melbourne
Tasman rugby union players
Australian expatriate rugby union players
Expatriate rugby union players in England
Australian expatriate sportspeople in New Zealand
Australian expatriate sportspeople in England
Expatriate rugby union players in New Zealand